Sir Frederick Charles Maitland Freake, 3rd Baronet (7 March 1876 – 22 December 1950) was a British polo player in the 1900 Summer Olympics and in the 1908 Summer Olympics.

Biography
He was born on 7 March 1876 and was educated at Magdalene College, Cambridge. In 1900 he was part of the BLO Polo Club Rugby polo team which won the silver medal.

Eight years later as a member of the Hurlingham Club he won the silver medal again.

In 1920 he succeeded to the Baronetcy of Cromwell House and Fulwell Park. He lived at the Old Manor House, Halford, Warwickshire and served as High Sheriff of Warwickshire in 1939. He died on 22 December 1950.

Family
Freake married, at St. Peter's, Cranley Gardens, on 7 July 1902, Alison Ussher, daughter of Christopher Ussher, of Eastwell, County Galway.

References

External links

1876 births
1950 deaths
Alumni of Magdalene College, Cambridge
English polo players
Polo players at the 1900 Summer Olympics
Polo players at the 1908 Summer Olympics
Olympic polo players of Great Britain
Olympic silver medallists for Great Britain
Baronets in the Baronetage of the United Kingdom
International Polo Cup
High Sheriffs of Warwickshire
Medalists at the 1908 Summer Olympics
Medalists at the 1900 Summer Olympics
Sheriffs of Warwickshire
Olympic medalists in polo